This is a glossary of words related to the Mafia, primarily the Italian American Mafia and Sicilian Mafia.

References

Mafia
Mafia
Organized crime terminology
Wikipedia glossaries using ordered lists